Rachel Polonsky is a British scholar specializing in Slavic Literature.   Her books include Molotov's Magic Lantern and English Literature and the Russian Aesthetic Renaissance. She is Vice-President of Murray Edwards College of the University of Cambridge, where she is a  Fellow in Slavonic Studies; Graduate Tutor in Modern Languages/ Slavonic Studies (Russian).

Education
MA  in English (Jesus College, University of Cambridge )
MA Russian Studies  (Princeton University ),
D.Phil (Oxford University ) with a thesis on the reception of English literature in early 19th century Russia.

Career
 Research Fellow at Emmanuel College, Cambridge. 
Independent scholar and freelance journalist in Moscow  
Fellow of Murray Edwards since 2011.

Bibliography 
 Polonsky, Rachel. Molotov's Magic Lantern: Travels in Russian History. Farrar, Straus and Giroux, 2011 
 Translated into Chinese by  Chuangchuang Lu as Cong Mosike dao Gulage : Eluosi li shi shang de guang hui yu hei an = Molotov's magic lantern : a journey in Russian history 
 Translated into Italian as La lanterna magica di Molotov : viaggio nella storia della Russia
 Translated into Dutch by  Nico Groen; Marianne Tieleman; Ansfried Scheifes as Molotovs toverlantaarn : een reis door de Russische geschiedenis
 Translated into Polish by Marek Król; as Latarnia magiczna Mołotowa : podróże w historię Rosji
 Polonsky, Rachel. English Literature and the Russian Aesthetic Renaissance. Cambridge [England]: Cambridge University Press,1998.

References 

Living people
Year of birth missing (living people)
Place of birth missing (living people)
20th-century British writers
21st-century British writers
20th-century British women writers
21st-century British women writers